Central Murchison was an electoral district of the Legislative Assembly in the Australian state of Western Australia from 1897 to 1901.

The district was located in the Western Australian outback. It existed for one term of parliament, and was created due to the large temporary population brought to the area by the brief Murchison gold rush. In 1898, it included the towns of Cue, Day Dawn, Cuddingwarra, Austin, and Mainland. Its only member was Frederick Illingworth, a senior Opposition politician. When the district was abolished ahead of the 1901 state election, Illingworth instead won election to the seat of Cue.

Members for Central Murchison

Election results

References

Central Murchison
1897 establishments in Australia
Constituencies established in 1897
1901 disestablishments in Australia
Constituencies disestablished in 1901